Garland is a surname.

Notable people 

Ailsa Garland (1917–1982), British fashion journalist and former editor of British Vogue
Alex Garland (born 1970), British novelist and director
Augustus Hill Garland (1832–1899), American lawyer and politician
Ben Garland (born 1988), American football player
Beverly Garland (1926–2008), American actress
Billy Garland (1918–1960), American guitarist, singer and songwriter
Chris Garland (born 1949), English footballer
Colin Garland (born 1986), Australian Rules footballer
Conor Garland (born 1996), American ice hockey people
Dale Garland (born 1980), Guernsey born British athlete
Darius Garland (born 2000), American basketball player
Donald Edward Garland (1918–1940), Irish recipient of the Victoria Cross
Edward Garland (cricketer) (1826–1882), English cricketer
Hamlin Garland (1860–1940), American novelist and poet
Hank Garland (1930–2004), Nashville studio musician
Harry Garland (born 1947), American entrepreneur
Harry G. Garland (1899–1972), American businessman
Howard Garland (born 1937), American mathematician
Jack Garland (disambiguation)
James C. Garland 20th President of Miami University
James Henry Garland, Roman Catholic bishop
Joe Garland (1903–1977), Jazz Musician
John of Garland, medieval English grammarian,  13th century 
John Garland (general) (1792–1861), career soldier in the U.S. Army
John J. Garland (1873–1925), Canadian politician
Jon Garland (born 1979), American baseball player
Judy Garland (1922–1969),  American actress and singer
Landon Garland (1810–1895), American chemist and natural historian
Lorraine Garland (born 1963), American folk musician
Margaret Garland (1893-1976), British artist
Mahlon Morris Garland (1856–1920), American politician
Maria Garland (1889–1967), Danish actress
Mel Garland (1942–1983), American basketball coach and player
Merrick Garland (born 1952), American judge and United States Attorney General
Nicholas Garland (born 1935), British political cartoonist 
Patrick Garland (1935–2013), British actor, writer and director
Patrick Garland (judge) (born 1929), a high court judge in the United Kingdom
Peter Garland (composer) (born 1952), American composer
Peter Garland (footballer) (born 1971), English footballer
Red Garland (1923–1984), American jazz pianist
Richard Garland (1927–1969), American film, stage and television actor
Robert Garland, American choreographer
Roger Garland (born 1933), Irish politician
Samuel Garland, Jr. (1830–1862), Confederate American Civil War General
Scott Garland (born 1973), American  professional wrestler best known as Scotty 2 Hotty
Scott Garland (1952-1979), former Canadian National Hockey League player
Seán Garland (1934–2018), Irish politician
Terry Garland (1953–2021), American blues guitarist, songwriter and singer 
Theodore Garland, Jr., American biologist
Tim Garland (born 1966), British jazz saxophonist
Sir Victor Garland (1934–2022), Australian politician and diplomat
Wayne Garland (born 1950), American baseball player
Winston Garland (born 1964), American basketball player

Fictional characters 
Lisa Garland, character from the Silent Hill series

Occupational surnames